Émile Vercken (born 22 February 1903, date of death unknown) was a Belgian track and field athlete and field hockey player who competed in the 1928 Summer Olympics.

He was a member of the Belgian field hockey team which finished fourth in the 1928 Olympic tournament. He played one match as forward and scored one goal.

At the same Olympics he also participated as track and field athlete and was part of the Belgian relay team which was eliminated in the first round of the 4x100 metre relay event.

External links
 
profile

1902 births
Year of death missing
Belgian male sprinters
Belgian male field hockey players
Olympic athletes of Belgium
Olympic field hockey players of Belgium
Athletes (track and field) at the 1928 Summer Olympics
Field hockey players at the 1928 Summer Olympics